Mukiltearth is the sixth studio album by American mathcore band The Fall of Troy, released on August 7, 2020. The album is composed of six songs written while the band members were still in high school, followed by four songs of new material.

Track listing

Personnel
The Fall of Troy
 Thomas Erak – guitar, bass, vocals
 Tim Ward – bass, vocals
 Andrew Forsman – drums, vocals

Additional
 Johnny Goss – synth, mixing
 Big Tom – vocals
 Abbo – artwork

References

External links section
Official site

2020 albums
The Fall of Troy albums